In Greek mythology, Linus (Ancient Greek: Λῖνος Linos "flax") may refer to the following personages:

Male

 Linus, an Arcadian prince as one of the 50 sons of the impious King Lycaon either by the naiad Cyllene, NonacrisApollodorus,
 Linus, the great musician son of Apollo.
 Linus, son of Apollo and Psamathe.
 Linus, a soldier in the army of the Seven against Thebes. He was killed by Hypseus at Thebes.

Female

Linos, in some accounts, the nymph mother of Pelops by Atlas.

Notes

References 
 Apollodorus, The Library with an English Translation by Sir James George Frazer, F.B.A., F.R.S. in 2 Volumes, Cambridge, MA, Harvard University Press; London, William Heinemann Ltd. 1921. ISBN 0-674-99135-4. Online version at the Perseus Digital Library. Greek text available from the same website.
Dionysus of Halicarnassus, Roman Antiquities. English translation by Earnest Cary in the Loeb Classical Library, 7 volumes. Harvard University Press, 1937-1950. Online version at Bill Thayer's Web Site
Dionysius of Halicarnassus, Antiquitatum Romanarum quae supersunt, Vol I-IV. . Karl Jacoby. In Aedibus B.G. Teubneri. Leipzig. 1885. Greek text available at the Perseus Digital Library.
Gaius Julius Hyginus, Fabulae from The Myths of Hyginus translated and edited by Mary Grant. University of Kansas Publications in Humanistic Studies. Online version at the Topos Text Project.
Graves, Robert, The Greek Myths: The Complete and Definitive Edition. Penguin Books Limited. 2017. 
Pausanias, Description of Greece with an English Translation by W.H.S. Jones, Litt.D., and H.A. Ormerod, M.A., in 4 Volumes. Cambridge, MA, Harvard University Press; London, William Heinemann Ltd. 1918. . Online version at the Perseus Digital Library
Pausanias, Graeciae Descriptio. 3 vols. Leipzig, Teubner. 1903.  Greek text available at the Perseus Digital Library.
Publius Papinius Statius, The Thebaid translated by John Henry Mozley. Loeb Classical Library Volumes. Cambridge, MA, Harvard University Press; London, William Heinemann Ltd. 1928. Online version at the Topos Text Project.
Publius Papinius Statius, The Thebaid. Vol I-II. John Henry Mozley. London: William Heinemann; New York: G.P. Putnam's Sons. 1928. Latin text available at the Perseus Digital Library.
Smith, William; Dictionary of Greek and Roman Biography and Mythology, London (1873). Linus 

Sons of Lycaon
Children of Apollo
Princes in Greek mythology
Arcadian characters in Greek mythology
Arcadian mythology